Half the Night is Gone is the third novel of Amitabha Bagchi published by Juggernaut Books which got DSC Prize for South Asian Literature in 2019,JCB Prize for Literature shortlist and The Hindu Literary Prize.

Plot 
It is a story about the Indian novelist Vishwanath whose heart was broken as he loss his son.

References 

2018 Indian novels
Juggernaut Books books
Novels about writers